Eva Vinje Aurdal (born 6 December 1957) is a Norwegian politician for the Labour Party.

In the 2009 and 2013 elections she was elected as a deputy representative to the Parliament of Norway from Møre og Romsdal. She has served as an elected member of Ålesund municipal council and Møre og Romsdal county council.

In 2012 she became a board member of the Central Norway Regional Health Authority.

References

1957 births
Living people
Politicians from Ålesund
Labour Party (Norway) politicians
Møre og Romsdal politicians
Deputy members of the Storting
Women members of the Storting
21st-century Norwegian politicians
21st-century Norwegian women politicians